Wabern is a municipality in the Schwalm-Eder district in northern Hesse, Germany. It lies on the Main-Weser Railway between Kassel and Frankfurt. From Wabern, the Edersee Railway runs to Bad Wildungen.

Geography

Location
The main centre of Wabern lies on the Eder and Schwalm floodplain, a few kilometres south of where the Schwalm empties into the Eder.

Constituent communities
The community of Wabern consists of ten centres, the main centre, bearing the same name as the whole municipality, and the nine outlying villages of Hebel, Rockshausen, Falkenberg, Udenborn, Unshausen, Uttershausen, Zennern, Niedermöllrich and Harle.

Economy
For a long time, Wabern was an important railway hub, where the Sauerland Line to Brilon branched off the Frankfurt-Kassel-Hanover mainline. Today the branchline ends at Bad Wildungen.

A big sugar factory processes the sugar beets in the autumn. These are grown over a wide area around the community.

Politics

Mayors
In June 2015 Claus Steinmetz (SPD) was elected mayor with 60.7% of the votes.

Municipal partnerships
  Lormaison (Oise), France (with Uttershausen)

Buildings

The local stately home, Landgrave Karl von Hesse's Jagd- und Lustschloss Wabern (roughly "Wabern Hunting and Delight Palace"), was built in 1701, mainly so that the Landgrave could practise falconry in the nearby Reiherwald (forest). In 1770 some remodelling work was done under the well known Baroque architect Simon Louis du Ry. The Schloss nowadays houses a youth centre.

The Evangelical Church was likewise built in the 18th century. It has a Rococo organ worth seeing.

Personalities
 Karl Schmidt (1932-2018), footballer
 Wilhelm Dilich (1571–1650), engraver
 Rolf Hocke (1955-    ), football official
 Fritz Harney (1879–1953), industrialist
 Philipp Losch (1864–1953), historian
 Ludwig Schneider (1893-1977), politician
 Arnold Strippel (1911-1994), SS Obersturmführer and war criminal

References

External links
 Wabern

Schwalm-Eder-Kreis